Aamo is a Norwegian surname. Notable people with the surname include:

Bjørn Skogstad Aamo (born 1946), Norwegian economist and politician
Reidar Magnus Aamo (1898–1972), Norwegian politician

See also
Amo (surname)

Norwegian-language surnames
Surnames of Norwegian origin